The 1997–98 New York Knicks season was the 52nd season for the New York Knicks in the National Basketball Association (NBA). During the off-season, the Knicks acquired Chris Mills from the Boston Celtics, and Chris Dudley from the Portland Trail Blazers. At midseason, the team traded Herb Williams to the Philadelphia 76ers in exchange for former All-Star forward Terry Cummings. However, Williams never played for the 76ers, and was re-signed by the Knicks for the remainder of the season. In the regular season, the Knicks held a 25–21 record at the All-Star break, and finished with a 43–39 record, which placed them in a tie for second place in the Atlantic Division with the New Jersey Nets. Despite their lowest winning percentage since the 1990–91 season, the team qualified for the NBA Playoffs as the #7 seed. They also hosted the 1998 NBA All-Star Game at Madison Square Garden. The Knicks had the fourth-best team defensive rating in the NBA.

This season saw All-Star center Patrick Ewing break his wrist trying to catch an alley-oop during a road game against the Milwaukee Bucks on December 20, 1997. The injury kept Ewing out for the rest of the regular season, and the entire Eastern Conference first round series against the Miami Heat. However, he did return for Game 2 against the Indiana Pacers in the Eastern Conference semi-finals. Ewing averaged 20.8 points, 10.2 rebounds and 2.2 blocks per game in 26 games. 

Without their star center for most of the season, Allan Houston finished second on the team in scoring, averaging 18.4 points per game, while Larry Johnson averaged 15.5 points and 5.7 rebounds per game. In addition, John Starks provided scoring off the bench, averaging 12.9 points per game, and finished in fourth place in Sixth Man of the Year voting, while Charles Oakley provided the team with 9.0 points and 9.2 rebounds per game, and was named to the NBA All-Defensive Second Team, and Mills contributed 9.7 points and 5.1 rebounds per game off the bench. The team also used Charlie Ward as its starting point guard, with Chris Childs coming off the bench. Ward contributed 7.8 points, 5.7 assists and 1.8 steals per game, and Childs provided the Knicks with 6.3 points and 3.9 assists per game. During the All-Star Weekend, Houston participated in the 2Ball competition, which replaced the Slam Dunk Contest this season, and Ward participated in the Three-Point Contest.

The 1998 NBA Playoffs matched the Knicks against the #2 seed Heat, who had eliminated the Knicks in the 1997 playoffs in a series that featured a brawl during Game 5. The altercation led to the suspension of six players, including five Knicks. In the 1998 series, after the Heat took a 2–1 series lead, another brawl occurred in the closing seconds of Game 4, which the Knicks won at home, 90–85 to even the series at two games each. Johnson and Heat center Alonzo Mourning, both former teammates on the Charlotte Hornets, exchanged punches, and New York coach Jeff Van Gundy clung to one of Mourning's legs at one point in an attempt to separate the two. Three players were suspended for Game 5: Johnson and Mourning were both suspended for two games, and Mills, who left the bench during the fight, was suspended for one game. The Knicks won Game 5 at Miami, 98–81, to advance to the second round, where they lost to the Pacers in five games.

Following the season, Oakley was traded to the Toronto Raptors after ten seasons in New York, while Starks was dealt along with Mills and Cummings to the Golden State Warriors, who Starks had previously played for during the 1988–89 season. Meanwhile, former All-Star forward Buck Williams retired after seventeen seasons in the NBA. 

For the season, the Knicks changed their home uniforms, adding blue side panels to their jerseys and shorts, while their alternate uniforms they wore on the road frequently for the previous two seasons became their primary road jerseys. Both uniforms remained in use until 2012, although they were slightly redesigned in 2001, where the side panels were removed from the bottom of their shorts.

NBA Draft

Roster

Roster notes
 Center Herb Williams was traded to the Philadelphia 76ers at midseason, but did not play for them, and was re-signed by the Knicks for the remainder of the season.

Regular season

Season standings

Record vs. opponents

Playoffs

|- align="center" bgcolor="#ffcccc"
| 1
| April 24
| @ Miami
| L 79–94
| Larry Johnson (21)
| Charles Oakley (12)
| Charles Oakley (4)
| Miami Arena15,200
| 0–1
|- align="center" bgcolor="#ccffcc"
| 2
| April 26
| @ Miami
| W 96–86
| John Starks (25)
| Terry Cummings (14)
| Charlie Ward (7)
| Miami Arena15,200
| 1–1
|- align="center" bgcolor="#ffcccc"
| 3
| April 28
| Miami
| L 85–91
| Allan Houston (27)
| Johnson, Oakley (7)
| four players tied (3)
| Madison Square Garden19,763
| 1–2
|- align="center" bgcolor="#ccffcc"
| 4
| April 30
| Miami
| W 90–85
| Houston, Johnson (18)
| Larry Johnson (9)
| Charlie Ward (7)
| Madison Square Garden19,763
| 2–2
|- align="center" bgcolor="#ccffcc"
| 5
| May 3
| @ Miami
| W 98–81
| Allan Houston (30)
| Buck Williams (14)
| Charlie Ward (14)
| Miami Arena15,200
| 3–2
|-

|- align="center" bgcolor="#ffcccc"
| 1
| May 5
| @ Indiana
| L 83–93
| John Starks (17)
| Charles Oakley (11)
| Charlie Ward (6)
| Market Square Arena16,630
| 0–1
|- align="center" bgcolor="#ffcccc"
| 2
| May 7
| @ Indiana
| L 77–85
| John Starks (20)
| Charles Oakley (9)
| Charlie Ward (10)
| Market Square Arena16,765
| 0–2
|- align="center" bgcolor="#ccffcc"
| 3
| May 9
| Indiana
| W 83–76
| Patrick Ewing (19)
| Chris Mills (8)
| Chris Childs (5)
| Madison Square Garden19,763
| 1–2
|- align="center" bgcolor="#ffcccc"
| 4
| May 10
| Indiana
| L 107–118 (OT)
| Houston, Starks (19)
| Charles Oakley (10)
| Chris Childs (6)
| Madison Square Garden19,763
| 1–3
|- align="center" bgcolor="#ffcccc"
| 5
| May 13
| @ Indiana
| L 88–99
| Allan Houston (33)
| Patrick Ewing (7)
| Patrick Ewing (11)
| Market Square Arena16,767
| 1–4
|-

Player statistics

NOTE: Please write player statistics in alphabetical order by last name.

Season

Playoffs

Awards and records
Charles Oakley, NBA All-Defensive Second Team

Transactions

References 

1997 in sports in New York City
New York Knick
1998 in sports in New York City
New York Knicks seasons
1990s in Manhattan
Madison Square Garden